Aqualung may refer to:

Diving-related
 Aqua-Lung, a type of diving equipment
 Aqua Lung/La Spirotechnique, a French manufacturer of diving equipment
 Usually in Britain, for a long time, a generic noun for open-circuit underwater breathing apparatus with one or more backpack cylinders and a demand valve
 Aqua Lung America, a US subsidiary of the French company

Music
 Aqualung (musician) or Matt Hales (born 1972), British musician
 Aqualung (Jethro Tull album), 1971, or its 2005 live album Aqualung Live
 Aqualung, a 2002 album by Aqualung

 "Aqualung" (song), a 1971 song by Jethro Tull
 "Aqualung", a song by Morcheeba from Charango, 2002
 "Aqualung", a song by Miss Li from the album A Woman's Guide to Survival, 2017

Other uses

See also
 Aquahung, a former name for the Bronx River in New York
 Dryptosaurus aquilunguis, a dinosaur